Between the Never and the Now is the third album by Vendetta Red. It was released on June 24, 2003, as an Enhanced CD.

Track listing
"There Only Is" – 3:49
"Stay Home" – 2:55
"Opiate Summer" – 3:36
"Seconds Away" – 3:31
"Shatterday" – 2:39
"Accident Sex" – 3:01
"Caught You Like A Cold" – 2:44
"Suicide Party" – 2:59
"Lipstick Tourniquets" – 4:12
"Ambulance Chaser" – 3:20
"Por Vida" – 2:34
"P.S. Love The Black" – 5:26

Notes
"Shatterday" was released as a single.
This is the first album by Vendetta Red on Epic Records.

Charts
Album - Billboard (United States)

Singles - Billboard (United States)

References

2003 albums
Vendetta Red albums
Epic Records albums
Albums produced by Jerry Finn